Hazel Johnson may refer to:
Hazel Johnson-Brown (1927–2011), née Hazel Johnson, American nurse and educator, 1st black female general in US Army
Hazel Johnson, character in Amy (1981 film)
Hazel M. Johnson (1935-2011), American environmental activist